Deborah Needleman is an American editor and writer. She was editor-in-chief of T: The New York Times Style Magazine from September 2012 to December 2016. Prior to that she was editor-in-chief of WSJ., and the creator of the paper's weekend lifestyle section and before that, the founding editor-in-chief of domino.

Early life
Needleman grew up in Cherry Hill, New Jersey and graduated from George Washington University where she studied philosophy and art history.

Career
Needleman worked as a photographer's assistant for a freelance photographer before becoming the photo editor at The Washington Post Sunday magazine. She wrote about gardens and design for The New York Times, Slate, and House & Garden, where she was editor-at-large, before becoming a magazine editor.

T Magazine 
Deborah Needleman was named editor of T: The New York Times Style Magazine in September 2012.

The first issue of T under Deborah Needleman in March 2013 featured Lee Radziwill on the cover, for which she and Sofia Coppola produced a short film. As part of the 10th Anniversary issue of T in October 2014, the magazine ran 10 different covers and the website looked back on some of T's most memorable covers.

In October 2015, Needleman was sharply criticized by T Magazine readers and then-New York Times Public Editor Margaret Sullivan for conflicts of interest created by Needleman's decision to assign Laura Arrillaga-Andreessen—wife of billionaire Marc Andreessen—a feature that appeared in the Oct. 12, 2015 issue of T titled "Five Visionary Tech Entrepreneurs Who Are Changing the World" without any disclosure that Arrillaga-Andreessen was "not only married to a major player in the tech world, but one who is a major investor in one of the companies she featured." Needleman, when asked to respond to the controversy by Sullivan, replied that she "agree[d] that we should have had a disclosure, and it was my mistake in not asking her if there were any potential conflicts. This was an oversight on my part." Needleman's rationale for not perceiving the conflicts as controversial was that Arrillaga-Andreessen is extraordinarily wealthy: "[S]he is, separately from her husband, a billionaire (making her through marriage a billionaire twice over) and for that reason I think I failed to consider any monetary conflict in her case." Media critics observed that upon closer examination, four of the five profiles Arrillaga-Andreessen had written for the issue were "poisoned by conflicts of interest."

Needleman and T Magazine were also sharply criticized by Washington Post media critic Erik Wemple for having "disappeared tech entrepreneur Elizabeth Holmes" from the Oct. 12, 2015 feature on tech visionaries after the Wall Street Journal reported that Holmes and Theranos—the blood testing company Holmes founded and was then chief executive of—appeared to be misleading consumers and investors as to the effectiveness of technology the company had claimed to pioneer. Wemple noted that T Magazine appended italicized text at the bottom of Arrillaga-Andreessen's article stating there had been "new developments involving Theranos," but didn't account for the discrepancy between Needleman's heralding of Holmes, in a letter to readers that appeared in the issue, as a "brilliant" entrepreneur who "has already had an enormous impact" and the lack of any "tagline informing readers that Holmes has gone poof." Holmes was subsequently charged with perpetrating "massive fraud" by the Securities and Exchange Commission and resigned in disgrace.

One of Needleman's last issues, in October 2016, was themed 'The Greats' and had 7 different covers featuring  Michelle Obama, Zadie Smith, William Eggleston, Kerry James Marshall, Junya Watanabe, Lady Gaga and Massimo Bottura.

WSJ 
The newspaper section Needleman created called 'Off Duty' publishes on Saturdays, and covers fashion, tech, design, and food. The name was suggested by her husband. While launching the section for the paper, in 2010, Needleman agreed to become the editor in chief of WSJ. magazine, the paper's then quarterly glossy magazine.    In 2012, Needleman went to the New York Times to become editor in chief of  T: The New York Times Style Magazine, .

domino magazine 
Launched by Condé Nast Publications in Spring 2005, domino was a decorating style magazine centered on the home. In its first year, domino was honored with  The Hot List Startup of the Year by Adweek, Top Launch of the Year by Media Industry Newsletter and The A-List 10 under 50 by Advertising Age.  In its third year, the magazine grew to a rate base of 800K by the time of its closing, it reached a circulation of 1 million. The magazine received two 2008 National Magazine Award nominations from the American Society of Magazine Editors (ASME).

It was announced on 28 January 2009, that Conde Nast would cease publishing domino,  and that Needleman had left the company. The New York Times published a story about the 'mourners' decrying the magazine's demise. Condé Nast tried to revive the title but floundered, and sold domino to St. Louis-based digital publisher Multiply in June 2018.

Personal 
Needleman lives in Manhattan with her husband, Jacob Weisberg, the co-founder with Malcolm Gladwell of Pushkin Industries, a podcasting and audio production company, and their two children. She is the author of The Perfectly Imperfect Home, an illustrated treatise on home decorating; and co-author of Domino: The Book of Decorating. She is on the board of the National Book Foundation and the Modernism Advisory Council of the World Monument Fund.

References

External links
New York Magazine on Deborah Needleman

American magazine editors
Year of birth missing (living people)
Living people
People from Cherry Hill, New Jersey
Women in publishing
The Wall Street Journal people
The New York Times people
People from Manhattan
Women magazine editors